Paulino Bernabe Senior (2 July 1932 – 10 May 2007) was a Spanish luthier.

Life 
Born in Madrid, Paulino Bernabé received music lessons from Daniel Fortea, a pupil of Francisco Tárrega,  and then learned the art of making classical guitars from José Ramírez III.  After opening his first own workshop in 1969 he developed an individual strutting system for the interior of his instruments. Since the early 1980s until shortly before his death in 2007 the master worked together with his son Paulino Bernabe II, who took over the workshop from his father.

Instruments made by Paulino Bernabe Senior were and are played by internationally know guitarists, inter alia by Narciso Yepes, Johanna Beisteiner and Alexandre Lagoya.

Awards
1974 Bernabe was awarded the Gold Medal at the International Crafts Exhibition in Munich (Germany).

Samples 
Videos of the Austrian classical guitarist Johanna Beisteiner played on a classical guitar made by Paulino Bernabe

References

External links 

Biography of Paulino Bernabe Senior on the official website of Paulino Bernabe
Article on Paulino Bernabe Senior on the official website of the German classical guitarist Thomas Karstens
Biography of Paulino Bernabe Senior on the official website of the Austria classical guitarist Johanna Beisteiner
Video with photos of Paulino Bernabe Senior (2009).

Spanish luthiers
Guitar makers
Classical guitar makers
Spanish classical guitarists
Spanish male guitarists
1932 births
2007 deaths
20th-century classical musicians
20th-century Spanish musicians
20th-century guitarists
20th-century Spanish male musicians